The House of Castellini Baldissera are an Italian family originating from Milan and Brescia.

Notable Members 
The Castellini Baldissera family's ancestral seat is the 18th century Villa Castellini, on Lago Maggiore as well as the 14th century Casa Atellani in Milan. They also own a number of castles and villas in Emilia Romagna and Brianza. The family is still active in banking, real estate and textile production within Italy and the rest of Europe and are also known for having co-owned Banca Barclays Castellini in Milan for several years.

Both the Castellini and Baldissera families have a long military tradition with the Royal Italian Army and Imperial Austrian Army; most members have occupied senior positions in both. Antonio Baldissera, served as the Governor of Italian Eritrea, a role which has caused the family to be the subject of much controversy. Antonio Baldissera's statue in Rome was recently vandalised by protestors as a response to the murder of George Floyd. The Baldissera family were also extremely close with the Austrian Imperial family, with the young Antonio Baldissera having been directly recommended for service by Maria Anna of Savoy, Empress consort of Austria. 

Ettore Conti of Verampio, another relative, was an Italian aristocrat and energy magnate who developed a close relationship with Victor Emanuel III. Conti ran a number of Italy's initiative to build the nations modern energy industry. Conti served as a Senator in both the Kingdom and Republic of Italy as well as having been a founding member of AGIP and Edison. Piero Portaluppi an architect and real estate mogul married into the family. He designed a great number of villas and palazzos in and around Milan. Portaluppi was also responsible for the restoration of the Duomo di Milano after World War II.

 Ettore Conti, Count of Verampio (1871-1972), a renowned Italian industrialist.
 Antonio Baldissera (1838-1917), Italian general and Governor of Italian Eritrea.
 Nicostrato Castellini (1829-1866), founding father of the Kingdom of Italy, served as a Major alongside Giuseppe Garibaldi.
 Bartolomeo Bezzi Scala Castellini (1820-1898), Italian military officer.
 Piero Portaluppi (1888-1967), architect and industrialist during the Fascist regime. 
 Louis Ignace, Baron of Marthod (1792-1812), Major in the Imperial Dragoons, recipient of the Legion of Honor.

History 
The Castellini family originated as wealthy landowners in the early 18th century, living in the various foothills and mountains around Milan, known as the "Alta Milanese" or Milanese Highlands. Around the mid 19th century the family began to industrialise, using their vast territories to raise Sheep whose wool could be used in their mills to produce fine fabrics and textiles. As the country's political system continued to shift, this business model became very popular amongst the Italian aristocracy, and other noble families who had similarly large estates. At the turn of the 20th century the Castellini family patriarch Clateus Castellini, used the wealth his family had amassed from textile production to found a number of private and merchant banks across Italy.

The family are also recognised in the Equestrian world for owning some of the finest stables in Europe and for their expertise in breeding English Thoroughbreds.

Medici di Marignano and Visconti di Modrone 
The Castellini family are related to a number of similarly notable families. Because of this the Castellini Baldissera are closely related to the Medici and Visconti, with a number of direct relatives holding titles in both families. Clateus Castellini married Marchioness Adele Medici of Marignano who was also a Vertua, while Elena Castellini married Count Raimondo Visconti di Modrone. The family are also more distantly related to the Marquesses Ranieri di Sorbello, the Pallavicini and the Marquesses of Casati.

d’Estienne De Marthod 
The Baldissera family are descended from the d’Estienne de Marthod Family, a noble house from Provence that holds the hereditary Lordship of Marthod. Baron Louis Ignace de Marthod served as a Major in the dragons de la Garde impériale and was commended for his remarkable skill in battle, with the Legion of Honor.

In Popular Culture 
The 2009 film "I Am Love" by Luca Guadagnino, the director of "Call Me By Your Name", was largely based on the Castellini Baldissera family, with some members appearing in cameos throughout the film. All the film's main scenes were shot on the family's various properties in Milan.

Notable Estates

References

Citations 

Italian nobility
Italian noble families
Noble families
Italian families